Nuba Conversations is a 2000 documentary and ethnographic film directed by Arthur Howes.

Synopsis
Ten years after shooting Kafi's Story British filmmaker Arthur Howes reentered in Sudan clandestinely to find out what had happened to the Nuba peoples of Torogi.

He found Jihad faces everywhere. For example, a remarkable television program, Fields of Sacrifice, celebrates that week's casualties in the war against the Nuba and features family members thanking Allah for having taken their sons and brothers as martyrs.

Much of the Nuba population was enrolled by the rebel movement Sudan People's Liberation Army during the Second Sudanese Civil War. Others have left their home places and live now in Refugee camp.

Arthur Howes takes his previous documentary Kafi's Story and he shows it to some Nuba people living in one of these refugee camps in Kenya.

Later on, in 2002, Nuba Conversations was presented in the United Nations headquarters in Nairobi to the parts involved in the warfare. And it is believed that it has strongly contributed to speed up the peace process.

Festivals
 Document 2 - International Human Rights Documentary Film Festival, U.K. (2004)
 Venice Film Festival, Italy (2000)
 Pan-African Film Festival, U.S.A.(2000)
 Paris Documentary Film Festival, France (2000)
 Festival Internacional de Documentários, Brazil

See also
Sri Lanka's Killing Fields, a 2011 documentary film.
Eyes and Ears Of God – Video surveillance of Sudan, a 2012 documentary
Darfur Now, a 2007 documentary

References

Sources
 Loizos, Peter, Sudanese Engagements: Three Films by Arthur Howes (1950–2004), Routledge, 2006

External links

Nuba Conversations in California Newsreel
Nuba Conversations in Link TV
"Nuba Conversations" in the New Internationalist
History of Cinema in Sudan
Article about Arthur Howes in The Guardian
Good news for the Nuba? in Survival International article of 28 February 2002
Nuba Survival Foundation
 Landmine Monitor Report 2001 about Landmines in Sudan (p. 225) available in The Monitor

Anthropology documentary films
Documentary films about war
2000 documentary films
2000 films
Films shot in Sudan
British documentary films
Documentary films about jihadism
Documentary films about Sudan
2000s British films